Delhi Cantt Assembly constituency, sometimes referred to as Delhi Cantonment is one of the legislative assembly constituencies of Delhi in northern India.
Delhi Cantt Assembly constituency is a part of New Delhi Lok Sabha constituency.  Voter-verified paper audit trail (VVPAT) will be used along with EVMs in Delhi Cantt assembly constituency in 2015 Delhi Legislative Assembly election. 26/11 hero Surinder Singh won this seat in 2013 by 355 votes.

Members of Legislative Assembly

Election results

2020

2015

2013

2008

2003

1998

1993

References

Assembly constituencies of Delhi
Delhi Legislative Assembly